Paul McCracken may refer to:

Paul McCracken (basketball) (born 1950), American basketball player
Paul McCracken (economist) (1915–2012), American economist